Lymphocyte antigen 6 complex, locus G6E (pseudogene) is a protein that in humans is encoded by the LY6G6E gene.

Function 

LY6G6E belongs to a cluster of leukocyte antigen-6 (LY6) genes located in the major histocompatibility complex (MHC) class III region on chromosome 6. Members of the LY6 superfamily typically contain 70 to 80 amino acids, including 8 to 10 cysteines. Most LY6 proteins are attached to the cell surface by a glycosylphosphatidylinositol (GPI) anchor that is directly involved in signal transduction.

References

Further reading 

 
 
 
 

Pseudogenes